The 1956 Jordan League was the 11th season of Jordan Premier League, the top-flight league for Jordanian association football clubs. The championship was won by Al-Jazeera.

References

External links
 Jordan Football Association website

Jordanian Pro League seasons
Jordan
Jordan
football